Wundarr the Aquarian is a fictional character appearing in American comic books published by Marvel Comics. The character was created by Steve Gerber and Val Mayerik and first appeared in Adventure into Fear #17. A pastiche of Superman, Wundarr was created based on Gerber's "love of the Superman character and (...) desire to do a little parody/homage".

Publication history
Wundarr first appeared in Adventure into Fear #17 (October 1973), written by Steve Gerber. Before long he became a frequent supporting character in Marvel Two-in-One. After Gerber's run on Marvel-Two-in-One, Wundarr mostly disappeared until the Project Pegasus saga (written by Mark Gruenwald and Ralph Macchio), in which he became "The Aquarian".

Relaunch candidate
In 2005, Marvel.com presented four characters to be relaunched. The Aquarian was one of these choices and took second place to Death's Head. Steve Gerber asked his fans on the Howard the Duck Yahoo! Group to vote against a revival of the character, since he would have neither creative control nor receive financial compensation from such a relaunch.

Legal issues
When Wundarr's first appearance was published, DC Comics claimed that Gerber had committed plagiarism (comics scholar Reed Tucker noted that "the line between homage and simply borrowing everything about Superman to meet (a) deadline (had been) blurred", to the extent that Wundarr even wore a blue-and-red unitard). Roy Thomas (Gerber's editor at the time) said that he had told Gerber prior to publication that the character would need to be changed, but that Gerber had not complied — and that as a result, Stan Lee considered firing Gerber. Ultimately, DC agreed to let Marvel continue using the character if sufficient changes were made to distinguish him from Superman (which, Gerber said in 2006, he had planned to do anyway).

Fictional character biography

Early years
On a distant planet called Dakkam (whose name has been described as "ridiculously similar" to 'Daxam'), a Dakkamite scientist named Hektu (based on Jor-El) believes that his world will be destroyed when their sun goes nova. He and his wife, Soja have an infant son named Wundarr, whom they plan to save from their world's destruction. They place him aboard a ship that is able to maintain his life support as long as necessary, and then launch him into outer space. Hektu and Soja later make flight and are captured and executed by the Internal Security Force to prevent them from alarming the populace. It is later found out that Hektu's apocalyptic prediction was incorrect, and that he sent his son away for nothing.

In July 1951, Wundarr's ship is caught by Earth's gravitational pull, and passes through a layer of cosmic rays before entering Earth's atmosphere and crashing in a Florida swamp. An elderly couple known only as Maw and Paw observe the crash from their car. Paw considers checking out the crash site, but Maw insists that it might contain Martians or Communists and demands that he ignore it; thus, Wundarr remains in his ship for a number of years, growing to physical maturity, though retaining the mind of a child. Twenty years later, Man-Thing senses someone inside the rocket, and is compelled to free whatever is trapped inside. Man-Thing being the first creature Wundarr sees, he is convinced that this is his mother. Man-Thing, being emotionless, does not react to Wundarr's cravings for attention. He learns very quickly of his amazing strength and bests Man-Thing in battle. Man-Thing's continued attempts to be left alone result in Wundarr eventually deciding that Man-Thing is not his mother.

With his great leaping ability, he eventually reaches Hydro-Base, where Namor and Namorita are trying to rehabilitate the population of Hydro-Men. Namor believes that Wundarr is a malicious intruder and quickly scares him off.  Two Dakkam officials, Tuumar and Zeneg, believe that Wundarr may seek to avenge his father and send a Mortoid robot to assassinate him. Wundarr's leaps bring him down in New York City, where he encounters Ben Grimm walking home from a screening of the martial arts film Five Fingers of Death. Landing in the middle of traffic, Wundarr is hurt and lashes back childishly, throwing the cars around.  Ben pulls no punches trying to stop him, but quickly realizes he is not dealing with a supervillain.  Namor and Namorita, having followed Wundarr, try to restrain Ben, which leads to fisticuffs between Namor and Ben.

Tuumar and Zeneg use the opportunity to attempt to kill Wundarr "for tranquility." When Ben and Namor team up and destroy the Mortoid, Tuumar and Zeneg flee, and Ben is left to be "Unca Benjy" to Wundarr, whom Reed Richards determines to be of high intellect, but with the knowledge and experience of a child. Reed builds Wundarr a containment suit that enables his body to expel small amounts of energy so that his body does not overload.

Wundarr also finds himself menaced by the Tiger Shark.

The Aquarian
Wundarr is captured by the Project Pegasus leaders in order to test his abilities. During these tests, the project leaders decide to use his energy-dampening abilities to probe the Cosmic Cube, a device of great cosmic power. During the probing, the Cosmic Cube overloads Wundarr's mind and body, sending him into an autistic coma (though his energy-dampening field still functions). This overload of energy greatly boosts his abilities, both mental and physical, giving him his power "dampening" field. Being in communication with the Cube, even for so short a time, he is granted great knowledge and a sense of purpose. He awakens from his coma, and is further transformed by the Cosmic Cube. In light of his new knowledge, he renames himself the Aquarian. His new power allows him to defeat the Nth Man. Since then, he roams somewhat aimlessly, seeking to bring peace and enlightenment to the Earth.

For a time, he leads the Water-Children, a philosophical cult dedicated to pacifism and awaiting the coming of the Celestial Messiah, and while teaching his group Aquarian is attacked by fellow Dakkamite Quantum, but is saved by the hero Quasar.

Aquarian serves as a psychic "nesting place" for the Cosmic Cube, just before it awoke to sentience. Aquarian also aids Doctor Strange in preventing planet-wide disasters on Earth.

The Initiative
After joining the Initiative program he is assigned a position on the Florida Initiative Team, The Command with Jennifer Kale and Siege. This team is the first to encounter the Marvel Zombies, who have made a breach into the Marvel Universe through the Nexus of Realities. He is then bitten on the shoulder by a zombified Deadpool whom Wundarr throws into the blades of a nearby skiff; Kale activates them, reducing Deadpool to a bloody pulp. Wundarr goes into a form of "hibernation" in an energy cocoon in order to stave off the zombie infection, and is later shown still in this state quarantined at A.R.M.O.R. headquarters.

Wundarr appears soon after, having recovered from the virus, and is shown defending Florida during the Skrull invasion of Earth. Later he is seen attending Ben Grimm's bachelor party.

Powers and abilities
Exposure to cosmic rays granted superhuman powers to Wundarr, and radiation from the Earth's sun causes all Dakkamites to undergo further mutagenic effects.

Initially, Wundarr could absorb energy directly into his body. This energy was converted into kinetic energy which could be used to increase his physical strength (allowing him to bench up to 15 tons), in leaping, or in energy projection. To keep him from building up more energy than his body could handle, Reed Richards of the Fantastic Four built him a suit that would allow him to "drain" the energy in his body.

After the exposure to the energies of the Cosmic Cube, the Aquarian's body generated a field around his body that nullified nearly all forms of energy (kinetic, electrical, magnetic, gamma, gravitational, etc.) that are higher than a certain preset level, which he calls his "null field". For example, a bullet contains a level of kinetic energy higher than what his Null field will allow for, so once the bullet enters his field, its energy is nullified. His own body is subject to this field, and he cannot move any faster than it will allow. This field naturally resides five feet from his body, and he cannot disable it; it is active at all times regardless of whether he is conscious or not.

 Physical strength - He has a great deal of physical strength, as shown in his besting of Man-Thing in battle. After his confrontation with the Cosmic Cube, his strength was lowered to the point of benching 1 ton.
 Leaping/flying - Wundarr has the ability to leap great distances. After his contact with The Cosmic Cube, however, his Null field negated any energy from leaping. However, since his Null field can negate gravity and wind, he can literally walk on air, via directed motion hovering.
 Knowledge - After being in contact with the Cosmic Cube, he is left with an unimaginable knowledge which he calls "Everything and Nothing". He appears to have a strong grasp on the properties of life and death, as well as peace and discourse. He is sometimes shown transmitting (through touch) this knowledge to other beings, often in order to create harmony.

References

External links
 

Characters created by Mark Gruenwald
Characters created by Ralph Macchio
Characters created by Steve Gerber
Characters created by Val Mayerik
Comics characters introduced in 1973
Marvel Comics aliens
Marvel Comics characters with superhuman strength
Marvel Comics extraterrestrial superheroes
Marvel Comics superheroes